Gertrude Fester is a South African feminist, women's activist and a member of the South African parliament in 1994. She was the Commissioner of the Gender Commission. She was a student of Harold Cressy High School in Cape Town and later in University of Cape Town. She completed her Doctorate from the London School of Economics in 2008 with a thesis entitled Women and citizenship struggles: A case of the Western Cape, South Africa 1980-2004.

References 

South African human rights activists
People from Cape Town
Alumni of the London School of Economics
University of Cape Town alumni
Living people
1952 births